The Domenigoni Mountains are a mountain range in Riverside County, California.  They lie north of the Menifee Valley and south of the Perris Valley and San Jacinto Valley, west and north of Diamond Valley and north of Domenigoni Valley.  The Domenigoni Mountains are composed primarily of metamorphic rock of the Triassic - Jurassic French Valley formation within Searls Ridge and the 1967 foot summit across the saddle to the west of it.  The extreme eastern end of Searls Ridge and the western extreme of the 1967 foot summit of the range are Cretaceous granitic rock.

Searls Ridge and the 1967 foot summit of the Domenigoni Mountains across a saddle to the west of it, enclose Diamond Valley Lake on its northern shore together with the Rawson Mountains on its southern shore.  Domenigoni Valley and Diamond Valley lie between them, and with the dams these mountains contain the reservoir.  The dams were built within the rock of the French Valley formation in both ranges.

References 

Mountain ranges of Riverside County, California
Mountain ranges of Southern California
Peninsular Ranges